Ingrid Johanna Maria Michon-Derkzen (born 14 September 1976) is a Dutch civil servant and politician of the conservative liberal People's Party for Freedom and Democracy (VVD). She was elected to the House of Representatives in the 2021 general election, and she previously served as a member of the municipal council of The Hague (2014–18).

Early life and career 
Michon was born in 1976 in the Gelderland city of Arnhem. Her parents owned a greengrocer's in that city. Michon studied Dutch law at Utrecht University.

She held several positions at the Ministry of the Interior and Kingdom Relations including acting program manager of further development of the organizational structure of the police and acting head of the bureau of the Director-General for Security. Starting in 2010, she served as the political assistant of Ivo Opstelten, the Minister of Security and Justice. When Opstelten resigned in 2015, Michon stayed at the Ministry of Justice and Security, working as project leader at its cybersecurity division.

In October 2015, she took a job at the Ministry of Infrastructure and the Environment as head of the drones team of the aviation division. Michon returned to the interior and kingdom relations ministry in 2018 to head the bureau of the director-general of the Central Government Real Estate Agency. She left that position, when she became a member of parliament in 2021.

Michon has also been serving on the boards of both Festival Classique, a classical music festival, and De Ooievaart, which offers boat tours in The Hague, since 2018.

Politics 
Michon joined the VVD in 2000 and was that party's third candidate in The Hague in the 2014 municipal elections. She was elected to the municipal council and served as vice caucus leader of the VVD. Her focus was on security, social affairs, poverty, and outdoor spaces. Michon decided not to run for re-election in 2018, because she was offered a worse place on the party list than in 2014.

She ran for member of parliament in the 2021 general election, being placed twentieth on the VVD's party list. She was elected with 1,654 preference votes and was sworn into the House of Representatives on 31 March. Michon became the VVD's spokesperson for primary and secondary education, aviation, water, and shipping, but her specialties were changed shortly after to police, fire brigade, the Public Prosecution Service, border protection, counter-terrorism, the NCTV, disaster and crisis management, national security, drug policy, and sex offenses. She is on the Committees for Agriculture, Nature and Food Quality; for Education, Culture, and Science (chair); and for Justice and Security, and she is a member of the Parliamentary Inquiry into Fraud Policy and Services.

In the House, Michon voiced her opposition to repatriating Dutch women who had joined the Islamic State, saying that they should be tried in the region. However, she later conceded that it would be preferable to try them in the Dutch judicial system if no other option is available. She also proposed to prohibit doxing – the practice of publishing private information – leading the cabinet to work on a ban.

Personal life 
In 2000, Michon moved from Arnhem to The Hague, where she has since been living with her husband. They have three children, two of which are twins.

References

External links 
 Personal website 

1976 births
21st-century Dutch civil servants
21st-century Dutch politicians
21st-century Dutch women politicians
Living people
Members of the House of Representatives (Netherlands)
Municipal councillors of The Hague
People from Arnhem
People's Party for Freedom and Democracy politicians
Political staffers
Utrecht University alumni